Cape Johnson is an ice-covered cape in northern Wood Bay at the east side of the terminus of Tinker Glacier, on the coast of Victoria Land, Antarctica. It was discovered in 1841 by Captain James Clark Ross, Royal Navy, who named it for Captain Edward John Johnson.

References

Headlands of Victoria Land
Borchgrevink Coast